Minnie Gentry (born Minnie Lee Watson, December 2, 1915 – May 11, 1993) was an American actress.

Gentry was born Minnie Lee Watson in Norfolk, Virginia, the daughter of Mincie and Taylor Watson. Her family moved to Cleveland during her childhood, where she began studying piano at the age of nine, at the Phyllis Wheatley School of Music. She began acting at the Friendly Inn Settlement and married Lloyd Gentry in 1932. Subsequently, she appeared in many plays at the African-American theater the Karamu House.

On Broadway, Gentry performed in All God's Chillun Got Wings (1975), The Sunshine Boys (1972), Ain't Supposed to Die a Natural Death (1971), and Lysistrata (1946). She also appeared in several films, including School Daze, Def by Temptation, and Jungle Fever. She portrayed Aunt Bess on the television series All My Children and Miriam George on Ryan's Hope. She also appeared on The Cosby Show.

Gentry had a daughter, Marjorie Hawkins. Her great-grandson is actor Terrence Howard.

On May 11, 1993, Gentry died at her home in Manhattan at age 77.

Filmography

References

External links

 
 at Yahoo! Movies

1915 births
1993 deaths
American film actresses
American stage actresses
American television actresses
Actresses from Cleveland
Actors from Norfolk, Virginia
Actresses from Virginia
African-American actresses
20th-century American actresses
20th-century African-American women
20th-century African-American people